Macquarie Galleries was a Sydney private art gallery established in 1925 by John Henry Young and Basil Burdett. It was located at "Strathkyle", 19 Bligh Street Sydney then moved to 40 King Street in 1945.

From 1991 to 1993 it was located at 83–85 McLachlan Avenue, Rushcutters Bay.
It is currently located at 585 Grosvenor Place, Sydney. There are also associated Macquarie Galleries in Canberra and Perth.

Basil Burdett left in 1935 or 1936 to become art critic for the Melbourne Herald. A E J L McDonnell became a partner around 1928. From 1939 to 1956 (59?) Lucy Swanton  and Treania Smith 'The bitches of Bligh St' ran the gallery then Treania Smith and Mary Killen.

Artists who have had major exhibitions include:
John Beard (various dates 1985–91)
Les Blakebrough (1964–88)
Robert Boynes (1985–93)
Rupert Bunny (1940–62)
John Coburn (1958–70)
Ray Crooke (1962–70)
Russell Drysdale (1942–61)
Ian Fairweather (1948–70 and posthumous exhibition 1975)
Graham Fransella (1983–90)
Donald Friend
James Gleeson (1950–70)
Thomas Gleghorn (1959)
Frank Hinder (1944–64)
Jeff Makin (1969–92)
Godfrey Miller
Max Miller (1985–91)
Idris Murphy (1972–89)
Hilda Rix Nicholas (1978)
Justin O'Brien (1950–82)
Bernard Ollis (1977–92)
John Olsen (1928-)
Desiderius Orban (1946–59)
Jenny Orchard (1986–92)
David Rankin (1971–90)
Alison Rehfisch (1933–58)
Jeff Rigby (1976–93)
Jeffrey Smart (1955–71)
Hossein Valamanesh (1984–92)
Roland Wakelin (first exhibitor, returning frequently, posthumous exhibition 1972)
Guy Warren (1964–91)
Salvatore Zofrea (1967–92)

Publications
The National Library of Australia holds copies of limited edition booklets published by Macquarie Galleries in conjunction with exhibitions of works by
Justin O'Brien 1980? 
John Beard 1988 
and 1991 
Russell Drysdale 1949
Dušan Marek by Bernice Murphy 1979 
Fred Cress 1989
Rafael Gurvich 1979 
Lionel Lindsay 1927

References

Australian art dealers
Art galleries established in 1925
1925 establishments in Australia